George G. Adams (August 26, 1850 – November 28, 1932) was an American architect from Lawrence, Massachusetts.

Life and career
George Gilman Adams was born August 26, 1850 in Rollinsford, New Hampshire to Benjamin Gilman Adams, a mill superintendent, and Sophia (Nutter) Adams. In 1854 the family moved to Lawrence, then a growing industrial city. He was educated in the Lawrence public schools before joining the office of civil engineer Baldwin Coolidge as a drafter in 1870. Two years later he joined the office of local architect Charles T. Emerson as a student. In 1875 Emerson and Adams formed a partnership, which lasted until 1878, when Emerson moved his business to Boston. Adams then opened his own office in Lawrence, from which he practiced for some forty years. From circa 1889 to 1891 Adams was in partnership with architect William P. Regan, but only two buildings can be positively attributed to the partnership.

In 1916 Adams, a Mason, was commissioned to design the new Masonic Temple in Lawrence. Though drawings were completed in 1917, the money to build was not available. Adams, then in his late 60s, chose to retire from business. In 1921 funds became available to complete the building, and Adams came out of retirement to execute the project. He associated himself with David M. Brown of Boston, a recent graduate of the Massachusetts Institute of Technology. Once the building was completed, Brown returned to Boston and Adams resumed practice full-time, retiring only shortly before his death.

In 1890 Adams built the Adams Block on Essex Street in Lawrence as an investment property, and maintained his practice there until temporary retirement. In the 1920s he practiced out of an office in the Bay State Building.

Personal life
In 1875 Adams was married to Mary Maria Leslie of Lynnfield. They had no children. In 1888 they moved into a large house, designed by Adams, at 1 Berkeley Street in Lawrence. Continued business success allowed the couple to move into a new Adams–designed house at 351 Prospect Street in 1907. Adams died November 28, 1932 at home.

Legacy
During his sixty–year career, Adams was the leading architect in Lawrence and its environs. He was noted throughout New England as an architect of public buildings. In addition to those he designed in Lawrence and Massachusetts, Adams designed a number of courthouses, town and city halls, libraries and other buildings in Maine, New Hampshire, New York and Vermont. At least eight buildings designed by Adams have been listed on the United States National Register of Historic Places, and others contribute to listed historic districts.

Architectural works
 Francis C. Clarke house, 247 Main St, North Andover, Massachusetts (1880)
 Asa Simons house, 213 Broadway, Methuen, Massachusetts (1881)
 Rockingham Town Hall, 7 The Square, Bellows Falls, Vermont (1886, burned 1925)
 Amesbury City Hall, 62 Friend St, Amesbury, Massachusetts (1887–88)
 Centralville M. E. Church, 800 Bridge St, Lowell, Massachusetts (1888)
 First Free Will Baptist Church, 63 Wellington St, Worcester, Massachusetts (1888)
 Hampton Town Hall, 136 Winnacunnet Rd, Hampton, New Hampshire (1888, burned 1949)
 Odd Fellows Building, 108 Main St, North Andover, Massachusetts (1888, partially extant)
 Bradlee School, 147 Andover St, Andover, Massachusetts (1889, NRHP 1982)
 Marston Building, 155 Middlesex St, Lowell, Massachusetts (1889)
 James Pierce house, 15 Pleasant St, Methuen, Massachusetts (1889–90)
 Strafford County Courthouse (former), 10 2nd St, Dover, New Hampshire (1889)
 Adams Block, 288 Essex St, Lawrence, Massachusetts (1890)
 Central Police Station (former), 11 Court St, Nashua, New Hampshire (1890–91)
 Dover City Hall, 288 Central Ave, Dover, New Hampshire (1890–91, burned 1933)
 New Hampshire Soldiers' Home, 139 Winter St, Tilton, New Hampshire (1890, demolished)
 Waterford High School, 46 4th St, Waterford, New York (1891, demolished 1961)
 Lawrence Public Library (former), 190 Hampshire St, Lawrence, Massachusetts (1892 and 1900, NRHP 1978)
 John R. Rollins School, Howard and Platt Sts, Lawrence, Massachusetts (1892, NRHP 2000)
 Randall Library, 19 Crescent St, Stow, Massachusetts (1893)
 Rockingham County Courthouse, 11 Front St, Exeter, New Hampshire (1893, demolished 1969)
 E. Frank Lewis house, 178 E Haverhill St, Lawrence, Massachusetts (1894)
 YMCA Building, 33 West St, Keene, New Hampshire (1894, demolished)
 Gleason Library, 22 Bedford Rd, Carlisle, Massachusetts (1895–96)
 High Service Water Tower, Ames St, Lawrence, Massachusetts (1896, NRHP 1978)
 Waterville Opera House and City Hall, 1 Common St, Waterville, Maine (1897–1902, NRHP 1976)
 Odd Fellows Building, 24 E Broadway, Derry, New Hampshire (1898, demolished)
 Odd Fellows Building, 7 Hampshire St, Methuen, Massachusetts (1898–99)
 Barre City Hall and Opera House, 6 N Main St, Barre, Vermont (1899, NRHP 1973)
 Essex County Courthouse, 43 Appleton St, Lawrence, Massachusetts (1901–03)
 Simon Fairfield Public Library, 290 Main St, Douglas, Massachusetts (1903)
 Adams Memorial Building, 29 W Broadway, Derry, New Hampshire (1904, NRHP 1982)
 Bay State Building, 11 Lawrence St, Lawrence, Massachusetts (1904–05)
 Colonial Theatre, 12 Hampshire St, Lawrence, Massachusetts (1904, demolished)
 Rochester Opera House and City Hall, 31 Wakefield St, Rochester, New Hampshire (1906–08)
 George G. Adams house, 351 Prospect St, Lawrence, Massachusetts (1907)
 American Woolen Company office building, 1 Mill St, Lawrence, Massachusetts (1907)
 Montpelier City Hall, 39 Main St, Montpelier, Vermont (1909–11)
 Stevens Memorial Hall, 1 Chester St, Chester, New Hampshire (1909–10, NRHP 2004)
 Truell Building, 372 Essex St, Lawrence, Massachusetts (1909, demolished 2010)
 St. Mary of the Assumption R. C. Church, 119 Broad St, Waterford, New York (1911–13)
 Lawrence Street Congregational Church, 54 Lawrence St, Lawrence, Massachusetts (1915–18)
 Charles M. Floyd School, 37 Highland Ave, Derry, New Hampshire (1916)
 Masonic Temple, 43 Jackson St, Lawrence, Massachusetts (1922–23)
 Lawrence City Hall remodeling, 100 Common St, Lawrence, Massachusetts (1923)
 Lawrence Gas Company Building, 370 Essex St, Lawrence, Massachusetts (1924, altered)
 Derry Library, 64 E Broadway, Derry, New Hampshire (1926–27)

Gallery of architectural works

Notes

References

1850 births
1932 deaths
Architects from Massachusetts
Architects from New Hampshire
19th-century American architects
20th-century American architects
People from Lawrence, Massachusetts